The discography of Jodeci, an American R&B group, consists of four studio albums, three compilation albums, thirteen singles, and thirteen music videos. The group was signed by Uptown Records after submitting a demo tape during a trip to New York. In 1991, they released their debut album, Forever My Lady, which peaked at number eighteen on the Billboard 200, and topped the Top R&B/Hip-Hop Albums chart in the United States. On April 28, 1995, the album was certified triple-platinum by the Recording Industry Association of America (RIAA). The album produced five singles, three of which topped the US R&B/Hip-Hop Songs: "Forever My Lady", "Stay", and "Come and Talk to Me". The last of these was certified gold by the RIAA.

In 1993, the group released its second studio album, Diary of a Mad Band, which peaked at number six on the Billboard 200 and number one on the Top R&B/Hip-Hop Albums. The album received a double-platinum certification by the RIAA, and spawned three singles: "Cry for You", "Feenin', and "What About Us". All peaked in the top 15 of the Hot R&B/Hip-Hop Songs; the first two charted in the top 20 on the UK Singles Chart.

The Show, the After Party, the Hotel (1995) was the group's third, as well as most successful, album. It peaked at number two on the Billboard 200, and number one on the Top R&B/Hip-Hop Albums, and was certified platinum by the RIAA. It was Jodeci's only album to chart outside of the United States, peaking at number four on the UK Albums Chart and appearing on the Australian ARIA Albums Chart and the Dutch Mega Album Top 100. The Show, the After Party, the Hotel produced three singles, including "Freek'n You", which charted within the top 15 on both the Billboard Hot 100 and R&B/Hip-Hop Songs, and was certified gold by the RIAA. The single also charted on the Australian and Dutch Singles Chart.

Before returning in 2015 with the studio album, The Past, The Present, The Future, Jodeci released three compilation albums between 2005 and 2008. These were: Back to the Future: The Very Best of Jodeci, which peaked at number six on the R&B/Hip-Hop Albums; 20th Century Masters – Millennium Collection: The Best of Jodeci, which charted number eighty-six on the R&B/Hip-Hop Albums; and Playlist Your Way.

Albums

Studio albums

Compilation albums

Singles

As featured artist

Promotional singles

Other charted songs

Music videos

Notes 

 A.  "What About Us" did not enter the Billboard Hot 100, but peaked at number 1 on Bubbling Under Hot 100 Singles, a chart which acts like a 25-song extension to R&B/Hip-Hop Songs.
 B.  "Knockin' Your Heels Off" did not enter R&B/Hip-Hop Songs, but peaked at number 19 on Bubbling Under R&B/Hip-Hop Singles, a chart which acts like a 25-song extension to R&B/Hip-Hop Songs.

References

External links
 

Discographies of American artists
Pop music group discographies
Rhythm and blues discographies
Soul music discographies